Whipping Boy: The Forty-Year Search for My Twelve-Year-Old Bully is a book written by Allen Kurzweil and published by HarperCollins on 20 January 2015 which later won the Edgar Award for Best Fact Crime in 2016.

External links 
 Book review on The Washington Post
 WHIPPING BOY - A writer spends forty years looking for his bully. Why? on The New Yorker
 As listed on Barnes & Noble

References 

Non-fiction crime books
American non-fiction books
Edgar Award-winning works
2015 non-fiction books
HarperCollins books